The men's beach volleyball tournament at the 2019 Southeast Asian Games took place at the Subic Tennis Court, Subic, Philippines from 29 November to 6 December 2019.

Schedule
All times are Philippine Time (UTC+08:00)

Results

Preliminary round

Pool A

|}

Pool B

|}

Knockout round

References

External links
  
Beach volleyball at the 2019 Southeast Asian Games

Men